Thomas Moen Hermansen, recording under the name Prins Thomas, is a Norwegian record producer and DJ often associated with collaborator Hans-Peter Lindstrøm as Lindstrøm & Prins Thomas.  Their music has been described as "space disco", and influences include electro, krautrock, psychedelia and prog.  Their records include the album Lindstrøm & Prins Thomas, released in 2005 on the Eskimo Recordings label, and Reinterpretations, a compilation of remixes and unreleased versions of tracks from the album.  The duo have released a second album, Lindstrøm & Prins Thomas II. Hermansen released his fourth LP album called Principe Del Norte on February 19, 2016.

Discography
2009: Mammut
2010: Prins Thomas
2012: Prins Thomas 2
2014: Prins Thomas III
2016: Principe Del Norte
2017: Prins Thomas 5
2019: Ambitions

Prins Thomas' label, Full Pupp, also features similar-sounding artists like Blackbelt Andersen and Todd Terje.

References

Living people
Norwegian DJs
Norwegian record producers
Year of birth missing (living people)